Chulpan (Sulpan) is a rural locality (a village) in Yangatausky Selsoviet, Salavatsky District, Bashkortostan, Russia. The population was 376 as of 2010. There are 12 streets.

Geography 
Chulpan is located 14 km north of Maloyaz (the district's administrative centre) by road. Yangantau is the nearest rural locality.

References 

Rural localities in Salavatsky District